Summit Meeting is a jazz album by drummer Elvin Jones, saxophonists James Moody and Bunky Green, trumpeter Clark Terry and guitarist Roland Prince recorded in 1976 and released on the Vanguard label.

Reception
The AllMusic review by Ken Drtyden described the album as containing "a lot of fun".

Track listing
 "Tee Pee Music" (Clark Terry) - 8:06 
 "Blues for Clark" (Bunky Green) - 5:55 
 "Moody Magic" (Ed Bland) - 6:09 
 "Summit Song" (Green) - 10:11 
 "Jones" (Terry) - 9:56

Personnel
Elvin Jones  - drums 
Clark Terry - trumpet, flugelhorn
Bunky Green - alto saxophone  
James Moody - tenor saxophone
Albert Dailey - piano
Roland Prince - guitar
David Williams - bass
Angel Allende - percussion

References

Elvin Jones albums
1977 albums
Vanguard Records albums